Hamley may refer to:

People:
Bob Hamley, the former head coach of the Colorado Mammoth of the National Lacrosse League
Edward Bruce Hamley KCB KCMG (1824–1893), British general, military writer, Conservative politician
Edward Hamley (poet) (1764 (baptised) – 1834), English clergyman and poet
Francis Hamley (1815–1876), British Army officer who administered the South Australian government from 1868 to 1869
Frederick George Hamley (1903–1975), United States Circuit Judge of the United States Court of Appeals for the Ninth Circuit
John Martin Hamley (1883–1942), Democrat in the Louisiana House of Representatives
Joseph Erin Hamley (1985–2006), an unarmed man fatally shot by Arkansas State Trooper Larry P. Norman
Joseph Osbertus Hamley (1820–1911), Head of the British Army Military Store Department during the New Zealand Wars
William Hamley (b. 18th century), British founder of Hamleys, one of the largest toy stores in the world
Wymond Ogilvy Hamley (1818–1907), English-Canadian collector of customs and politician
Molly Hamley-Clifford (1887–1956), British stage and film actress

Places:
County of Hamley, cadastral unit in the Australian state of South Australia
Hamley, South Australia, locality in the Australian state of South Australia
Hamley Bridge, South Australia, community in South Australia
Hamley Building in the list of historic places in Victoria, British Columbia
Hamley Run, Ohio, unincorporated community in Athens County, in the U.S. state of Ohio

Companies:
 Hamleys the largest toy retailer in world.

See also
Hambley
Hamersley (disambiguation)